Monica Montgomery Steppe (born 1978) is an American politician in San Diego, California. She currently serves as a member of the San Diego City Council representing City Council District 4. She is a Democrat, although city council positions are officially nonpartisan per California state law. She serves on the board of the California Reparations Task Force.

Life and career
Monica Montgomery was born in San Diego in 1978 to Clifford and Patricia Montgomery. She attended Bonita Vista High School. While in high school she fought with school officials over a ban on wearing bandannas that she felt unfairly targeted the three percent of students who were black. She earned a Bachelor of Science from Spelman College and a Juris Doctor degree from California Western School of Law.

Montgomery worked as a San Diego City Hall staffer for Councilmember Todd Gloria during his term as interim mayor, Mayor Kevin Faulconer, and Councilmember Myrtle Cole. She resigned from her position in Cole's office the day after Cole made remarks arguing police officers were justified in racially profiling black residents. After leaving the City, Montgomery joined the ACLU of San Diego & Imperial Counties as a criminal justice advocate.

She married Steven Steppe on August 22, 2020.

San Diego City Council
In 2013, Montgomery was a candidate in the special election to represent District 4 of the San Diego City Council following Tony Young's resignation to lead the local Red Cross Chapter. District 4 includes the neighborhoods of Alta Vista, Broadway Heights, Chollas View, Emerald Hills, Encanto, Greater Skyline Hills, Jamacha, Lincoln Park, Lomita Village, North Bay Terrace, Oak Park, O'Farrell, Paradise Hills, Redwood Village, Rolando Park, South Bay Terrace, Valencia Park, and Webster. Montgomery was eliminated in the primary, coming in last in a field of nine candidates with three percent of the vote.

Montgomery ran again to represent District 4 in the 2018 San Diego City Council election, challenging her former boss Myrtle Cole. Montgomery cited wanting to guide policy around development in District 4 as well as Cole's previous comments on racial profiling as the two primary factors that led to her decision to run again. Montgomery came in a surprise first place in the June primary, six votes ahead of the incumbent Cole. Montgomery went on to win election to the City Council in the November 2018 runoff. This marked the first time that an incumbent had failed to be reelected to the City Council since 1992.

References

External links
 City of San Diego: Monica Montgomery website
 Montgomery for City Council website

Living people
San Diego City Council members
California Democrats
Democratic Socialists of America politicians from California
Women city councillors in California
1978 births
California Western School of Law alumni
Spelman College alumni